Honkey Kong is the third studio album by American rapper Apathy, released August 23, 2011.

Music 
The album features guest contributions by Celph Titled, Vinnie Paz, Slaine, Ill Bill, Xzibit, Blacastan, Mad Lion, General Steele, Esoteric, Crypt the Warchild, Motive, Planetary, and Reef the Lost Cauze. Producers for Honkey Kong such as DJ Premier and Vanderslice contribute to a limited number of beats on this album, though the majority of the production is handled by Apathy himself. Along with the album, Apathy released the Primate Mindstate EP as a bonus disc to the album.

Reception 
Upon its release, Honkey Kong received widespread critical acclaim. On Metacritic, which assigns a normalized rating out of 100 to reviews from mainstream critics, the album received an average score of 82, based on 5 critics, indicating "universal acclaim." DT Swinga of Hiphopsite.com gave the album four and a half out of five stars and called it "Ap’s best album to date". HipHopDX gave the album 4 out of 5 stars, commenting that "While many of the songs are simple showcases of his verbal acrobatics, he handles concepts just as well." The album received an "XL" rating from hip hop magazine XXL, calling Apathy a "lyrical wizard" and praising his story telling abilities.

Track listing

Charts

References 

2011 albums
Apathy (rapper) albums
Albums produced by DJ Premier
Albums produced by Statik Selektah